Szymon Rekita (born 5 January 1994) is a Polish cyclist, who currently rides for UCI Continental team .

Major results

2012
 1st  Time trial, National Junior Road Championships
 6th Time trial, UEC European Junior Road Championships
2013
 3rd Time trial, National Under-23 Road Championships
2014
 1st  Time trial, National Under-23 Road Championships
 10th Overall Carpathian Couriers Race
2015
 1st  Time trial, National Under-23 Road Championships
2016
 4th Coppa Città di Offida
 7th Time trial, UEC European Under-23 Road Championships
 9th Overall Tour of Hainan
2017
 4th Overall Tour of Rhodes
1st Stage 2
2018
 4th Circuit de Wallonie
 5th Time trial, National Road Championships
 9th Overall Tour du Jura
1st Stage 1
 9th Overall Tour of Antalya
 10th Overall Tour Alsace
2019
 1st  Overall Tour of Antalya
1st Stage 3
 5th Overall Tour de Luxembourg
 7th Overall Circuit des Ardennes
 8th Overall Tour de Normandie
2021 
 3rd Overall Szlakiem Grodów Piastowskich
 3rd Overall Tour of Romania
 4th Time trial, National Road Championships
2022
 1st  Overall Tour of Szeklerland
1st Stage 2
 National Road Championships
2nd Road race
3rd Time trial
 5th Overall Tour of Bulgaria
1st Stages 3b & 5

References

External links

1994 births
Living people
Polish male cyclists
People from Biskupiec